Melvin Williams may refer to:

 Melvin Williams (admiral), American naval officer
 Melvin Williams (actor) (1941–2015), American actor
 Melvin Williams (American football) (born 1979), American football player
 Melvin Williams (musician) (born 1953), American gospel musician